Helene Engelmann (later Jaroschka, 9 February 1898 – 1 August 1985) was an Austrian pair skater. With Alfred Berger, she became the 1924 Olympic champion and a two-time world champion. She also won a world title with Karl Mejstrik.

Life and career 
Engelmann was the daughter of Eduard Engelmann Jr., a three-time champion at the European Figure Skating Championships. She began skating as a small child, having been introduced to the sport at an early age.

Aged 15, she won the pair skating title at the 1913 World Championships with her skating partner Karl Mejstrik. She remains the youngest-ever world champion in the pair category.

Engelmann also won World titles in 1922 and 1924 with partner Alfred Berger. They won gold at the 1924 Winter Olympics in Chamonix, France. Engelmann did not compete at the European Championships, as her father did, because the pair category was not included until 1930.

Results

With Alfred Berger

With Karl Mejstrik

Navigation

Austrian female pair skaters
Olympic figure skaters of Austria
Figure skaters at the 1924 Winter Olympics
Olympic gold medalists for Austria
1898 births
1985 deaths
Figure skaters from Vienna
Olympic medalists in figure skating
World Figure Skating Championships medalists
Medalists at the 1924 Winter Olympics